Bùi Đơn Dương, known in his films as Đơn Dương (August 27, 1957 – December 8, 2011), was a Vietnamese film actor, who emigrated to the United States in 2003. He began acting in 1982 and has appeared in over 50 feature films. He won the Best Vietnamese Actor award for his role in the 1992 Vietnamese film Dấu Ấn của Quỷ ("Devil's Mark"). The 1996 film Cỏ Lau, in which he also acted, won Best Picture at the Vietnamese National Film Festival.

Early life and education
Don Duong was born in Da Lat, South Vietnam on August 27, 1957.

Career
His first appearance in a U.S. film was in 1999, with the release of Three Seasons, an award-winning film directed by his nephew Tony Bui and shot in Vietnam.

In 2001, Duong traveled to the U.S. to film two films. In Green Dragon (2001), a film directed by Tony Bui's brother Timothy Linh Bui and starring Patrick Swayze and Forest Whitaker, Duong played a Vietnamese refugee who assisted Swayze's character. In We Were Soldiers (2002), Duong played Nguyễn Hữu An, a PAVN lieutenant colonel who led Vietnamese forces against the soldiers led by Mel Gibson's character.

Upon his return to Vietnam in 2002, Duong was subjected to severe criticism by some Vietnamese citizens and government officials for his involvement in these two projects, particularly for his portrayal as Colonel An in We Were Soldiers where he orders his Viet Minh troops to kill captured and wounded French soldiers. Within a few months, the Vietnamese Actors' Association expelled him, he was banned from working in Vietnam, and his passport was confiscated. Duong wrote a letter to his sons, reflecting upon his ordeal and stating that they "can know the truth, to affirm that I am always and forever not a traitor." The letter was released to the public and published in the Los Angeles Times. In the letter he described the two movies as just "cinema":

Movies must reflect the portrait of history. 'Green Dragon' re-creates the refugee camps full of tragedy and chaos but still not lacking love and fellowship. ... When I portrayed the character Tai, I had to assume the viewpoint of that character, not my own viewpoint. Only idiots who know nothing about movies would confuse Don Duong with the character Don Duong portrays.

As the filmmaking community in the U.S. and elsewhere spoke out against the government's negative treatment of Duong, the government of Vietnam relented and allowed him and his family to emigrate to the United States.

He has also acted in the South Korean film Farewell the River. As of 2006, Duong lived in the San Francisco Bay Area.

Later life and death
On December 8, 2011, he died of heart failure and a brain haemorrhage at the age of 54.

Filmography
Some of his films

References

External links

1957 births
2011 deaths
People from Da Lat
Male actors from the San Francisco Bay Area
American male film actors
Vietnamese male film actors
Male actors of Vietnamese descent
Vietnamese emigrants to the United States